Vallières may refer to:

People
Vincent Vallières (born 1978), Canadian singer
Yvon Vallières (born 1949), Canadian politician
Pierre Vallières (1938 – 1998), Canadian journalist and writer.

Places
Vallières, Aube, a commune in the Aube department, France 
Vallières, Haute-Savoie, a former commune in the Haute-Savoie department, France 
Vallières, Nord-Est, a commune in the Nord-Est department, Haiti
Vallières-sur-Fier, a commune in the Haute-Savoie department, France
Vallières Arrondissement, an arrondissement in the Nord-Est department, Haiti

See also
Vallier and Vallière, surnames
 Vale (disambiguation)